Maria Mariana is a 1996 Malaysian Malay-language action crime film directed by Yusof Haslam. It revolves around a story of two sisters, Maria and Mariana, who are very different in character. The film explores the issue of a troublesome yet rebellious teenager but at the same time reveals that love can change anything.

Synopsis
Maria and Mariana are sisters but they are poles apart. Mariana is wild while her elder sister is more reserved and takes great interest in her education and career. When they become adults, Maria joins the police force while Mariana remains the same. The presence of a man named Jefri changes Mariana’s life. However, Jefri chooses to marry Maria instead, much to her disappointment. Tony and Robert, leaders of a criminal gang which Maria is trying to nab, kidnap Mariana. The ever responsible Maria risks her own life to save her sister.

Cast
 Erra Fazira as Maria
 Ziana Zain as Mariana
 Edika Yusof as Jeffri
 Roy Azman as Ray
 Noraini Hashim as Zainab
 Kenji Sawahi as Tony
 A. Galak as Mr. Zakaria

Box office
The film which was released on 18 April 1996 went box office and grossed RM4.7 million.

Awards and nominations
13th Malaysian Film Festival, 1997
 Special Jury Award - Box-Office Film (Won)

2nd Anugerah Skrin TV3, 1997
 Best Supporting Actress - Ziana Zain (Won)

Soundtrack

The film soundtrack was predominantly composed by Johari Teh and features Ziana Zain as the lead singer of all the ten soundtracks.

 "Korban Cinta" (Johari Teh)
 "Dialog: Tiada Kepastian" (Johari Teh)
 "Dialog: Kasih Ku Pertahankan"  (Anuar, Azam Dungun)
 "Dialog: Setia Ku Di Sini" (Salman, Nurbisa II)
 "Dialog: Madah Berhelah" (Saari Amri)
 "Dialog: Anggapan Mu" (Asmin Mudin)
 "Dialog: Putus Terpaksa" (Saari Amri)
 "Dialog: Bersama Akhirnya" (Johari Teh)
 "Dialog: Kemelut Di Muara Kasih" (Saari Amri, Lukhman S.)
 "Dialog: Korban Cinta" (Johari Teh)

Television
A drama series of the same title was produced based on the same plot of the movie. The lead cast of the drama was held by Abby Abadi and Azza Elite.

External links
 

1996 films
Malaysian drama films
Malay-language films
1996 romantic drama films
1990s action films
Films directed by Yusof Haslam
Films produced by Yusof Haslam
Films with screenplays by Yusof Haslam
Skop Productions films
Grand Brilliance films